The 2001 Railway Cup Hurling Championship was the 74th series of the inter-provincial hurling Railway Cup. Three matches were played between 10 November 2001 and 11 November 2001 to decide the title. It was contested by Connacht, Leinster, Munster and Ulster.

Munster entered the championship as the defending champions.

On 11 November 2001, Munster won the Railway Cup after a 1-21 to 1-15 defeat of Connacht in the final at MacDonagh Park, Nenagh. It was their 43rd Railway Cup title overall and their second title in succession.

Munster's Alan Browne was the Railway Cup top scorer with 2-13.

Results

Final

Top scorers

Overall

Single game

Sources

 Donegan, Des, The Complete Handbook of Gaelic Games (DBA Publications Limited, 2005).

References

Railway Cup Hurling Championship
Railway Cup Hurling Championship